The Senior women's race at the 1977 IAAF World Cross Country Championships was held in Düsseldorf, West Germany, at the Galopprennbahn Düsseldorf-Grafenberg on March 20, 1977.   A report on the event was given in the Glasgow Herald.

Complete results, medallists, 
 and the results of British athletes were published.

Race results

Senior women's race (5.1 km)

Individual

Teams

Note: Athletes in parentheses did not score for the team result

Participation
An unofficial count yields the participation of 96 athletes from 17 countries in the Senior women's race, one athlete less than the official number published.

 (5)
 (6)
 (6)
 (6)
 (6)
 (6)
 (4)
 (6)
 (6)
 (5)
 (6)
 (6)
 (6)
 (5)
 (6)
 (5)
 (6)

See also
 1977 IAAF World Cross Country Championships – Senior men's race
 1977 IAAF World Cross Country Championships – Junior men's race

References

Senior women's race at the World Athletics Cross Country Championships
IAAF World Cross Country Championships
1977 in women's athletics